The Oakton Classic is an annual invitational high school marching band competition held at Oakton High School in Vienna, Virginia.  The 32nd Annual Oakton Classic will be held on October 21, 2017. The George Mason University Green Machine and the Oakton High School Marching Cougars will be the exhibition bands this year.

Traditionally, a college marching band and the Oakton High School Marching Band perform for exhibition.  College bands that have performed at the competition in the past include the James Madison University Marching Royal Dukes, the Marching Virginians of Virginia Tech, the Christopher Newport University Marching Captains, etc.

October 2, 2004, was named "Oakton Classic Day" in Fairfax County, Virginia in honor of the 20th anniversary of this competition.

Previous Grand Champions
2017 - Westfield High School
2016 - McLean High School
2015 - Rock Ridge High School
2014 - James Madison High School
2013 - McLean High School
2011 - Parkview High School
2010 - Battlefield High School
2009 - Robinson Secondary School
2008 - Westfield High School
2007 - Westfield High School
2006 - Robinson Secondary School
2005 - Robinson Secondary School
2004 - Thomas Jefferson High School for Science and Technology
2003 - Chantilly High School
2002 - Hickory High School
2001 - Chantilly High School
1993 - Herndon High School
1992 - Herndon High School

2008 Bands

Competition
Brentsville District High School
Briar Woods High School
Centreville High School
Chopticon High School (Division A Winner)
Courtland High School
Dominion High School
Fairfax High School
Falls Church High School
Freedom High School
Gar-Field Senior High School
Hayfield Secondary School
Henry E. Lackey High School
Heritage High School
Herndon High School (Division AAAA Winner and 2nd place overall)
Liberty High School
Loudoun County High School
Loudoun Valley High School
Luray High School
Manassas Park High School
Mount Vernon High School
Ocean Lakes High School (Division AA Winner)
Osbourn High School
Rappahannock County High School
Riverbend High School
Robert E. Lee High School
Sherando High School
South County Secondary School (Division AAA Winner)
South Lakes High School
Wakefield High School
Westfield High School (Division AAAAA Winner and Grand Champion)

Exhibition
James Madison University
Oakton High School
Virginia Polytechnic Institute and State University

2007 Bands

Competition
Brentsville District High School
Caroline High School
Clarke County High School
Courtland High School (Division AA Winner)
Falls Church High School
Hayfield Secondary School
Henry E. Lackey High School
Lake Braddock Secondary School
Mount Vernon High School
Robert E. Lee High School (Division A Winner)
Thomas Jefferson High School for Science and Technology (Division AAA Winner)
Wakefield High School
Westfield High School (Division AAAAA Winner and Grand Champion)

Exhibition
Oakton High School
University of Virginia

2006 Bands

Competition
Annandale High School (Division AAAA Winner)
Caroline High School
Centreville High School
Falls Church High School
Hayfield Secondary School (Division A Winner)
Manassas Park High School
Mount Vernon High School
Potomac Falls High School
Robert E. Lee High School
Robinson Secondary School (Division AAAAA Winner and Grand Champion)
Thomas Jefferson High School for Science and Technology (Division AAA Winner)
Wakefield High School
Washington-Lee High School (Division AA Winner)
York High School
Yorktown High School

Exhibition
Oakton High School

References

Sources
Virginia Marching Band Contests
Oakton Classic Day
Oakton High School's Band site

Marching band competitions